Corinna is a genus of corinnid sac spiders first described by Carl Ludwig Koch in 1841. They are found in Mexico and south to Brazil, and with selected species found in Africa.

Species 
 it contains eighty-five species:

C. aberrans Franganillo, 1926 — Cuba
C. aechmea Rodrigues & Bonaldo, 2014 — Brazil
C. aenea Simon, 1896 — Brazil
C. alticeps (Keyserling, 1891) — Brazil
C. andina (Simon, 1898) — Ecuador
C. annulipes (Taczanowski, 1874) — Brazil, French Guiana, Peru
C. anomala Schmidt, 1971 — Ecuador
C. areolata Thorell, 1899 — Cameroon
C. balacobaco Rodrigues & Bonaldo, 2014 — Brazil
C. bicincta Simon, 1896 — Brazil
C. bonneti Caporiacco, 1947 — Guyana
C. botucatensis (Keyserling, 1891) — Brazil
C. bristoweana Mello-Leitão, 1926 — Brazil
C. brunneipeltula Strand, 1911 — New Guinea
C. buccosa Simon, 1896 — Brazil (Amazonas)
C. bulbosa F. O. Pickard-Cambridge, 1899 — Mexico to Panama
C. bulbula F. O. Pickard-Cambridge, 1899 — Panama
C. caatinga Rodrigues & Bonaldo, 2014 — Brazil
C. capito (Lucas, 1857) — Brazil
C. chickeringi (Caporiacco, 1955) — Venezuela
C. colombo Bonaldo, 2000 — Brazil, Argentina
C. corvina Simon, 1896 — Paraguay
C. cribrata (Simon, 1886) — Tanzania (Zanzibar)
C. cruenta (Bertkau, 1880) — Brazil
C. demersa Rodrigues & Bonaldo, 2014 — Brazil
C. ducke Bonaldo, 2000 — Brazil
C. eresiformis Simon, 1896 — Brazil (Amazonas)
C. escalvada Rodrigues & Bonaldo, 2014 — Brazil
C. ferox Simon, 1896 — Brazil, Peru
C. galeata Simon, 1896 — Brazil
C. granadensis (L. Koch, 1866) — Colombia
C. grandis (Simon, 1898) — Brazil, Guyana
C. haemorrhoa (Bertkau, 1880) — Brazil
C. hyalina Rodrigues & Bonaldo, 2014 — Brazil
C. ignota Mello-Leitão, 1922 — Brazil
C. inermis (Bertkau, 1880) — Brazil
C. javuyae Petrunkevitch, 1930 — Puerto Rico
C. jecatatu Rodrigues & Bonaldo, 2014 — Brazil
C. kochi (Simon, 1898) — Colombia
C. kuryi Rodrigues & Bonaldo, 2014 — Brazil
C. loiolai Rodrigues & Bonaldo, 2014 — Brazil
C. longitarsis Strand, 1906 — São Tomé and Príncipe
C. loricata (Bertkau, 1880) — Brazil, Uruguay, Paraguay, Argentina
C. macra (L. Koch, 1866) — Colombia
C. major Berland, 1922 — Kenya
C. mandibulata Strand, 1906 — Ethiopia
C. maracas Rodrigues & Bonaldo, 2014 — Brazil
C. mexicana (Banks, 1898) — Mexico
C. modesta Banks, 1909 — Costa Rica
C. mourai Bonaldo, 2000 — Brazil
C. napaea Simon, 1898 — St. Vincent
C. nitens (Keyserling, 1891) — Peru, Bolivia, Brazil, Uruguay, Paraguay, Argentina
C. nossibeensis Strand, 1907 — Madagascar
C. octodentata Franganillo, 1946 — Cuba
C. olivacea Strand, 1906 — Ethiopia
C. parva (Keyserling, 1891) — Brazil
C. parvula Bryant, 1940 — Cuba, Hispaniola
C. peninsulana Banks, 1898 — Mexico
C. perida Chickering, 1972 — Panama
C. phalerata Simon, 1896 — Brazil
C. pictipes Banks, 1909 — Costa Rica
C. plumipes (Bertkau, 1880) — Brazil
C. propera (Dyal, 1935) — Pakistan
C. pulchella (Bryant, 1948) — Dominican Rep.
C. punicea Simon, 1898 — St. Vincent
C. recurva Bonaldo, 2000 — Brazil
C. regii Rodrigues & Bonaldo, 2014 — Brazil
C. rubripes C. L. Koch, 1841 — Brazil, Guyana
C. sanguinea Strand, 1906 — Ethiopia
Corinna s. inquirenda Strand, 1906 — Ethiopia
C. selysi (Bertkau, 1880) — Brazil
C. spinifera (Keyserling, 1887) — Nicaragua
C. tatei Gertsch, 1942 — Venezuela
C. telecoteco Rodrigues & Bonaldo, 2014 — Brazil
C. testacea (Banks, 1898) — Mexico
C. toussainti Bryant, 1948 — Hispaniola
C. tranquilla Rodrigues & Bonaldo, 2014 — Brazil
C. travassosi Mello-Leitão, 1939 — Brazil
C. urbanae Soares & Camargo, 1948 — Brazil
C. variegata F. O. Pickard-Cambridge, 1899 — Guatemala, Guyana
C. venezuelica (Caporiacco, 1955) — Venezuela
C. vesperata Rodrigues & Bonaldo, 2014 — Brazil
C. vilanovae Rodrigues & Bonaldo, 2014 — Brazil
C. zecarioca Rodrigues & Bonaldo, 2014 — Brazil
C. ziriguidum Rodrigues & Bonaldo, 2014 — Brazil

References 

Corinnidae
Araneomorphae genera